Ileibacterium valens  is a Gram-positive bacterium from the genus of Ileibacterium which has been isolated from the intestine of a murine from New York City in the United States.

References

External links
Type strain of Ileibacterium valens at BacDive -  the Bacterial Diversity Metadatabase

Erysipelotrichia
Bacteria described in 2017